A superstructure is an upward extension of an existing structure above a baseline, in civil and naval engineering.

Superstructure may also refer to:

 Superstructure (condensed matter): some additional structure superimposed on a more basic structure, e.g. magnetic ordering in a crystal or helical ordering in a protein.
 A universe (mathematics) obtained from a set by taking the power set countably many times.
 A structure (mathematical logic)  of which another structure is a substructure.
 A key concept in Marxist philosophy, see base and superstructure.

See also
Megastructure (disambiguation)
MegaStructures is a documentary television series